Gaston of Foix (Gaston de Foix) may refer to:

Gaston I of Foix-Béarn (d. 1315)
Gaston II of Foix-Béarn (1308–1343)
Gaston III of Foix-Béarn (1331–1391)
Gaston IV of Foix (1422–1472)
Gaston of Foix, Prince of Viana (1444–1470)
Gaston of Foix, Duke of Nemours (1489–1512)
Gaston de Foix, Count of Candale (d. 1500)